Kalmaklarovo (Qalmaqtar) is a rural locality (a village) in Salavatsky Selsoviet, Salavatsky District, Bashkortostan, Russia. The population was 208 as of 2010. There are 5 streets.

Geography 
Kalmaklarovo is located 8 km southeast of Maloyaz (the district's administrative centre) by road. Maloyaz is the nearest rural locality.

References 

Rural localities in Salavatsky District